Antonio Matera (born 11 October 1996) is an Italian footballer  who plays as a midfielder for  club U.S. Avellino 1912

Club career
He made his professional debut in the Lega Pro for Barletta on 6 April 2014 in a game against Pontedera.

On 11 July 2019 he signed a 2-year contract with Cavese.

On 19 July 2021 he joined Avellino.

References

External links
 
 

1996 births
Living people
People from San Severo
Footballers from Apulia
Italian footballers
Association football midfielders
Serie B players
Serie C players
Serie D players
A.S.D. Barletta 1922 players
S.S. Fidelis Andria 1928 players
Benevento Calcio players
Potenza Calcio players
Cavese 1919 players
U.S. Avellino 1912 players
Sportspeople from the Province of Foggia